Thesinine is a pyrrolizidine alkaloid first isolated from Thesium minkwitzianum from which it derives its name.  It is also found in the flowers and seeds of borage.

References

Pyrrolizidine alkaloids
Cinnamate esters